English First may refer to:

 EF English First, a language school franchise in Switzerland
 English First (lobbying organization), a U.S. lobbying group of the English-only movement